Emamzadeh Pir Nahan (also Romanized as Emāmzādeh Pīr Nahān; also known as Pīr Nahān and Pīr Nehān) is a village in Jeyhun Dasht Rural District, Shara District, Hamadan County, Hamadan Province, Iran. At the 2006 census, its population was 723, in 155 families.

References 

Populated places in Hamadan County